Kosugi (written: 小杉 lit. "small Japanese cedar" or コスギ in katakana) is a Japanese surname. Notable people with the surname include:

, Japanese actor and film director
, Japanese voice actor
, American karateka and actor
, Japanese comedian
, Japanese karateka and actor
, Japanese professional wrestler
, Japanese politician
, Japanese classical composer
, pen-name of Kosugi Tamezō, Japanese writer
, Japanese footballer

See also
Kosugi Station (disambiguation), multiple railway stations in Japan
Kosugi, Toyama, a former town in Imizu District, Toyama Prefecture, Japan

Japanese-language surnames